Ceratophyllidae is a family of fleas. Its members are parasites of mainly rodents and birds. It contains two subfamilies, one containing over 40 genera, and the other just three.

Subfamily Ceratophyllinae
Aenigmopsylla
Aetheca
Amalaraeus
Amaradix
Amphalius
Baculomeris
Brevictenidia
Callopsylla
Ceratophyllus
Citellophilus
Dasypsyllus
Eumolpianus
Glaciopsyllus
Hollandipsylla
Igioffius
Jellisonia
Kohlsia
Libyastus
Macrostylophora 
Malaraeus
Margopsylla
Megabothris
Megathoracipsylla

Subfamily Ceratophyllinae (continued)
Mioctenopsylla
Myoxopsylla
Nosopsyllus
Opisodasys
Orchopeas
Oropsylla
Paraceras
Paramonopsyllus
Pleochaetis
Plusaetis
Rostropsylla
Rowleyella
Smitipsylla
Spuropsylla
Syngenopsyllus
Tarsopsylla
Thrassis
Traubella
Psittopsylla

Subfamily Dactylopsyllinae
Dactylopsylla
Foxella
Spicata

References

 
Insect families